Old Fashioned Love may refer to:

"Old Fashioned Love" (1923), standard song by James P. Johnson and Cecil Mack recorded by many artists
"Old Fashioned Love", 1939 song by Frank Loesser and Fritz Miller
Old Fashioned Love, 1975 album by John Fahey
Old Fashioned Love" (Gary Goetzman, Mike Piccirillo), single from Smokey Robinson's 1982 album Yes It's You Lady